Alvirne High School is located in the town of Hudson, New Hampshire, United States, with an enrollment of approximately 1,300 students from grades 9–12. Alvirne gets its name from a prominent Hudson family, the Alfred and Virginia Hills family, who left a large piece of property to the town in the early 20th century to provide land for the building of a high school. A portmanteau of their names (Alfred and Virginia and their son Ned) provides the name for the school. The school mascot is the bronco, and the school colors are maroon and gold.

Opened in 1992, the Wilbur H. Palmer Vocational - Technical Center, a career and technical education school, is housed on the same campus as Alvirne High School. Students from area high schools whose schools do not have CTE programs currently offered at the Wilber H. Palmer Center may apply for admission to the school. Students in the Wilber H. Palmer Center take their core academic classes as part of Alvirne High School, and take vocational courses at the center.

History
On September 8, 1974, a large fire gutted the building, requiring most of it to be rebuilt. The agricultural school was opened in the 1950s, and the modern vocational building opened in 1993. The large, 100-year-old Alvirne barn was heavily damaged by a fire in late March 1993, a year after the Palmer Vocational Center was opened.

Administration

School district
Alvirne High School is the only high school in the Hudson School District, under the authority of School Administrative Unit # 81 of New Hampshire (SAU81). The system is under the direction of the Hudson School Board, consisting of five elected members.

Notable alumni
 Jason Brennan, philosopher
 Derek Griffith, late model racing driver
 Shawn Jasper, former Speaker of the New Hampshire House of Representatives 
 Hollis Robbins, American academic

References

External links
Alvirne High School official website

Educational institutions established in 1950
Schools in Hillsborough County, New Hampshire
Hudson, New Hampshire
Public high schools in New Hampshire
1950 establishments in New Hampshire